Astacin-like metalloendopeptidase is a protein that in humans is encoded by the ASTL gene.

References

External links